Silica granulomas are a skin condition which may be caused by automobile and other types of accidents which produces tattooing of dirt (silicon dioxide) into the skin that then induces the granuloma formation.

See also 
 Granuloma
 Skin lesion

References

External links 

Skin conditions resulting from physical factors